Castlecroft is a suburb of Wolverhampton, West Midlands, located on the edge of the city, WSW of the city centre. It is situated where the Merry Hill, and Tettenhall Wightwick wards meet, and also borders South Staffordshire.

History
The name Castlecroft is derived from Castlecroft House, a large house and former hotel that was converted into flats in 2004/2005.

Demography
The plurality (23%) of Castlecroft's population is aged between 25 - 44. 16.3% of Castlecroft's population is aged over 75, compared with just 7.8% for Wolverhampton as a whole. The majority of people in Castlecroft (82.2%) classify their religion as Christian.

Housing and amenities
It has two distinct estates, divided by a former railway line.  The eastern part is mostly 1930s private housing, the western part mostly 1950s council housing.
There are several houses in the area, notably Castlecroft Gardens, constructed by Major Kenneth Hutchinson Smith from reclaimed bricks and timber.
Castlecroft is where Smestow Academy and Castlecroft Primary school are situated. Bhylls Acre Primary school is also in the area, but thanks to historical accident, it falls under the jurisdiction of Staffordshire County Council. Castlecroft benefits from a shopping arcade at Windmill Lane, as well as The Firs pub.

Sport
A.F.C. Wulfrunians football club, an association football club who currently play in the Midland Football League are based here, at the Castlecroft Stadium. Wolverhampton Rugby Union Football Club and Wolves Women are also based at the same location.

See also
Listed buildings in Lower Penn

References

Areas of Wolverhampton